Polygala serpentaria is a species of flowering plant in the milkwort family (Polygalaceae). It is native to South Africa and Botswana.

References

serpentaria
Flora of Botswana
Flora of South Africa